David Bambatha Maphgumzana Sibeko (26 August 1938 in Johannesburg, South Africa – 12 June 1979 in Dar es Salaam, Tanzania) was known as the "Malcolm X of South Africa" and began his political career as a journalist for the black South African magazine Drum.  During his tenure with that magazine, he became a leading figure within the Pan Africanist Congress of Azania (South Africa). During the 1970s he headed the United Nations Observer Mission of the Pan Africanist Congress (PAC) in New York City and used this position to popularize the PAC particularly among African Americans.  In 1979 Sibeko was partially successful in a leadership coup against Potlako Leballo. However, he failed to get support from the Second Azanian People's Liberation Army, recruited from the 1976 student protest generation and was shot dead during an argument with them at his flat in Oyster Bay, Dar es Salaam, Tanzania on 12 June 1979.

David Sibeko's contribution to the liberation struggle in South Africa unfortunately is little known. In actuality his influence was pervasive and, some would argue, on par with that of Nelson Mandela. Sibeko adroitly used his position as the head of the PAC Observer Mission at the United Nations as a way to unite diverse sectors of the international black community behind the PAC.  Thus he counted among his personal friends and supporters personages as varied as Andrew Young, Stokely Carmichael (later known as Kwame Ture), Julius Nyerere, Louis Farrakhan, and the heads of state of countries such as Haiti (pre-Aristide), to Libya, Egypt, the future Zimbabwe, Ghana, Guinea, and many more that comprised the Organization of African Unity.

A sharp thinker, and, above all, an eminently practical, big-hearted man with an easy laugh, he could be seen coaxing support from a U.S. State Department official one minute, gathering support from the communist Chinese the next, and persuading the Soviet representatives to assist the PAC in some small matter or another after that.  One could easily find the same ANC officials that would detract him and the PAC during the day, drinking, eating (he would personally cook for his guests), and laughing at his apartment on West End Avenue in New York City that same evening. Had he remained as a highly effective diplomat as a counterbalance to the revolutionary activities of the younger generation the PAC would have continued as a serious rival to the ANC.

See also

Apartheid
Sharpeville Massacre
Black Consciousness Movement
Pan Africanism

Further reading
 Leeman, Lieutenant-General Bernard, "The Pan Africanist Congress of Azania", in AFRICA TODAY A Multi-Disciplinary Snapshot of the Continent in 1995, edited by Peter F. Alexander, Ruth Hutchison and Deryck Schreuder, The Humanities Research Centre, The Australian National University Canberra, 1996, pages 172–195 .
 Sampson, A.  South Africa 1978–1979.  Johannesburg: Black and Gold.

References

External links
PAC Literature

1938 births
1970s murders in Tanzania
1979 crimes in Tanzania
1979 deaths
1979 murders in Africa
20th-century journalists
Anti-apartheid activists
Assassinated South African politicians
Deaths by firearm in Tanzania
Pan Africanist Congress of Azania politicians
People from Johannesburg
People murdered in Tanzania
South African journalists
South African people murdered abroad